Jaroslav Bílek (born 16 March 1971) is a Czech former cyclist. He competed in the team time trial at the 1992 Summer Olympics. He also won the Peace Race in 1993.

References

External links
 

1971 births
Living people
Czech male cyclists
Olympic cyclists of Czechoslovakia
Cyclists at the 1992 Summer Olympics
People from Vimperk
Sportspeople from the South Bohemian Region